Bolbocerastes imperialis is a species of earth-boring scarab beetle in the family Geotrupidae. It is found in North America.

Subspecies
These two subspecies belong to the species Bolbocerastes imperialis:
 Bolbocerastes imperialis imperialis Cartwright, 1953
 Bolbocerastes imperialis kansanus CARTWRIGHT, 1953

References

Further reading

 

Geotrupidae
Articles created by Qbugbot
Beetles described in 1953